Pyrus pyrifolia is a species of pear tree native to East Asia. The tree's edible fruit is known by many names, including: Asian pear, Japanese pear, Chinese pear, Korean pear, Taiwanese pear, apple pear, zodiac pear, three-halves pear, papple, naspati and sand pear. Along with cultivars of P. × bretschneideri and P. ussuriensis, the fruit is also called the nashi pear. Cultivars derived from Pyrus pyrifolia are grown throughout East Asia, and in other countries such as India, Nepal, Australia, New Zealand, and the United States (e.g., California). Traditionally in East Asia the tree's flowers are a popular symbol of early spring, and it is a common sight in gardens and the countryside.

The fruits are not generally baked in pies or made into jams because they have a high water content and a crisp, grainy texture, very different from the European varieties. They are commonly served raw and peeled. The fruit tends to be quite large and fragrant, and when carefully wrapped (it has a tendency to bruise because of its juiciness), it can last for several weeks or more in a cold, dry place.

Culture 
Due to their relatively high price and the large size of the fruit of cultivars, the pears tend to be served to guests, given as gifts, or eaten together in a family setting.

In cooking, ground pears are used in vinegar- or soy sauce-based sauces as a sweetener, instead of sugar. They are also used when marinating meat, especially beef, with a notable example being in the Korean dish bulgogi, due to the presence of enzymes to tenderize the proteins in the meat.

In Australia, these pears were first introduced into commercial production beginning in 1980.

In Japan, fruit is harvested in Chiba, Ibaraki, Tottori, Fukushima, Tochigi, Nagano, Niigata, Saitama and other prefectures, except Okinawa. Nashi may be used as a late Autumn kigo, or "season word", when writing haiku. Nashi no hana (pear flower) is also used as a kigo of spring. At least one city (Kamagaya-Shi, Chiba Prefecture) has the flowers of this tree as an official city flower.

The fruit are carried to nearby markets by human porters or, increasingly, by truck, but not for long distances because they bruise easily.

In Taiwan, pears harvested in Japan have become luxurious presents since 1997 and their consumption has jumped.

In China, the term "sharing a pear" is a homophone of "separate", as a result, sharing a pear with a loved one can be read as a desire to separate from them.

In the South Korean city of Naju, there is a museum called The Naju Pear Museum and Pear Orchard for Tourists.

In Cyprus, the pears were introduced in 2010 after initially being investigated as a new fruit crop for the island in the early 1990s. They are currently grown in Kyperounta.

Cultivars 

Cultivars are classified in two groups. Most of the cultivars belong to the Akanashi ('Russet pears') group, and have yellowish-brown rinds. The Aonashi ('Green pears') have yellow-green rinds.

Important cultivars include:
 'Chojuro' (Japan, 1893?) ('Russet pears')
 'Kosui' (Japan, 1959; the most important cultivar in Japan) ('Russet pears')
 'Hosui' (Japan, 1972) ('Russet pears')
 'Imamuraaki' (Japan, native) ('Russet pears')
 'Nijisseiki' (Japan, 1898; name means "20th century", also spelled 'Nijusseiki') ('Green pears')
 'Niitaka' (Japan, 1927) ('Russet pears')
 'Okusankichi' (Japan, native) ('Russet pears')
 'Raja' (new) ('Russet pears')
 'Shinko' (Japan, pre-1941) ('Russet pears') ('Russet pears')
 'Hwangkeum' (Korea, 1984, 'Niitaka' × 'Nijisseiki')
 'Huanghuali' (not to be confused with the wood of Dalbergia odorifera, also called Huanghuali)

Gallery

Notes

External links 

 Guidelines for the conduct of tests for distinctness, uniformity and stability - Japanese pear, The International Union for the Protection of New Varieties of Plants, 1994-11-04.
  ニホンナシ育成品種の系統図 (Cultivar trees of Japanese pears), National Institute of Fruit Tree Science, Japan
 Shin Hiratsuka, Shao-Ling Zhang "Relationships between fruit set, pollen-tube growth, and S-RNase concentration in the self-incompatible Japanese pear" Scientia Horticulturae, 95 (4), 309-318 (2002).
 Carlos Castillo, Takeshi Takasaki, Toshihiro Saito, Shigemi Norioka, Tetsu Nakanishi "Clonlng of the S8-RNase (S8 allele) of Japanese Pear (Pyrus pyrifolia Nakai)" Plant Biotechnology, 19 (1), 1-6 (2002).

pyrifolia
Fruits originating in East Asia
Pears
Taxa named by Nicolaas Laurens Burman